David Safford Walbridge (July 30, 1802 – June 15, 1868) was a politician from the U.S. state of Michigan.

Walbridge was born in Bennington, Vermont, where he attended the common schools.  He moved to New York in 1820 and engaged in mercantile and agricultural pursuits at Geneseo from 1820 to 1826 and at Jamestown from 1826 to 1842. Then he moved to Kalamazoo, Michigan, in 1842 and again engaged in mercantile pursuits as well as becoming a large landowner and stock raiser.

Walbridge was a member of the Michigan State House of Representatives in 1848 and served from 1849 to 1850 in the Michigan Senate. He served as permanent chairman of the first Republican State convention held July 6, 1854, at Jackson, Michigan. In 1854, he defeated incumbent Democrat Samuel Clark to be elected as a Republican from Michigan's 3rd congressional district to the 34th United States Congress. He was re-elected to the 35th Congress, serving from March 4, 1855, to March 3, 1859.

On August 27, 1856, Abraham Lincoln visited Kalamazoo to take part in a campaign rally for John C. Fremont. Congress was in session, so Walbridge was in Washington, D.C. In his absence, his wife Eliza Taggart Walbridge, acted as a hostess, providing tea for Lincoln and Zachariah Chandler. This was recalled by Lincoln in a letter he wrote to Chandler four years later.

David S. Walbridge later resumed his former pursuits and was also appointed by President Andrew Johnson to serve as postmaster of Kalamazoo, Michigan. He died there and was interred in Mountain Home Cemetery.

References

David S. Walbridge at The Political Graveyard

1802 births
1868 deaths
19th-century American politicians
Republican Party members of the Michigan House of Representatives
Michigan postmasters
Republican Party Michigan state senators
Republican Party members of the United States House of Representatives from Michigan